Yevhen Dobrovolskyi (born 10 February 1995 in Ukraine) is a Ukrainian football midfielder who most recently played for Vereya in the Bulgarian First League.

Career
Dobrovolskyi is a product of Uzhhorod Youth Sportive School System. In 2012, he signed a contract with FC Hoverla, but played only in FC Hoverla Uzhhorod reserves. In the main-team squad Dobrovolskyi made his debut playing as a substitute player in the match against FC Zorya Luhansk on 30 April 2016 in the Ukrainian Premier League.

References

External links
Profile at FFU Official Site (Ukr)

1995 births
Living people
Ukrainian footballers
FC Hoverla Uzhhorod players
FC Vereya players
Ukrainian Premier League players
First Professional Football League (Bulgaria) players
Expatriate footballers in Bulgaria
Association football midfielders